Eric Davidson may refer to:

 Eric H. Davidson (1937–2015), American biologist
 Eric Davidson (survivor) (1915–2009), one of the last survivors of the Halifax Explosion